Arjas (also Romanized as Arjās; also known as Argus, Arjāsb, and Ugāsin) is a village in Khenaman Rural District, in the Central District of Rafsanjan County, Kerman Province, Iran.

Population 
At the 2006 census, its population was 50, in 22 families.

References 

Populated places in Rafsanjan County